Winter X Games XVIII (re-titled Winter X Games Aspen '14; styled as Winter X Games Eighteen in the official logo) were held from January 23 to January 26, 2014, in Aspen, Colorado. They were the 13th consecutive Winter X Games to be held in Aspen. The events were broadcast on ESPN.

Results

Medal count

Skiing

Women's SuperPipe results

Men's SuperPipe results

Men's Big Air results

Men's SlopeStyle results

Women's SlopeStyle results

Snowboarding

Men's Snowboarder X results

Women's Snowboarder X results

Men's Big Air results

Men's slopestyle results

Women's slopestyle results

Women's SuperPipe results

Men's SuperPipe results

Snowmobiling

Freestyle results

Long Jump results

SnoCross Adaptive results

SnoCross results

References

External links
  Winter X Games XVIII Page

Winter X Games
2014 in multi-sport events
2014 in American sports
Sports in Colorado
Sport in Savoie
Pitkin County, Colorado
2014 in sports in Colorado
2014 in snowboarding
2014 in alpine skiing
Winter multi-sport events in the United States
International sports competitions hosted by the United States
2014 in esports
January 2014 sports events in the United States